Jabez Wight Giddings (September 27, 1858 – July 1, 1933) was an American politician who served in the Michigan Senate from the 28th district from 1887 to 1890, and as the 27th lieutenant governor of Michigan from 1893 to 1895.he died at age 74 in Taos New Mexico

References

1858 births
1933 deaths
Republican Party Michigan state senators
Lieutenant Governors of Michigan
19th-century American politicians